The 2023 season is Tanjong Pagar United FC's 18th season at the top level of Singapore football. The club will also compete in the Singapore Cup.

On 10 November, comedian Jarvis joins Singapore Premier League club Tanjong Pagar United.  

Being in the 3rd season after rejoining the league, they announced on 29 November that they have not decided who to retain for the 4th season.   However, on 9 December 2022, they announced on the instagram that they will be retaining 9 players for the 2023 season.

Squad

Singapore Premier League

U21 Squad

Coaching staff

Transfers

In

Pre-season

Loan In

Loan Return

Out 
Pre-season

Mid-season

Loan Out 
Pre-season

Extension / Retained

Friendlies

Pre-season

Team statistics

Appearances and goals 

Numbers in parentheses denote appearances as substitute.

Competitions

Overview

Singapore Premier League

Singapore Cup

See also 
 2020 Tanjong Pagar United FC season
 2021 Tanjong Pagar United FC season
 2022 Tanjong Pagar United FC season

Notes

References 

Tanjong Pagar United FC
Tanjong Pagar United FC
2023
1